The Arun Jaitley Stadium (formerly Feroz Shah Kotla stadium) is a cricket ground in Delhi, India. The ground has hosted 34 Test matches, the first of these was in 1948 between India and the West Indies. Twenty-four One Day Internationals (ODIs) have also been played at the ground, the first in 1982 between India and Sri Lanka.

In cricket, a five-wicket haul (also known as a "five-for" or "fifer") refers to a bowler taking five or more wickets in a single innings. This is regarded as a notable achievement. The first bowler to take a five-wicket haul in a Test match at Arun Jaitley Stadium was C. R. Rangachari for India against West Indies in 1948. Anil Kumble became one among only two bowlers in Test history to take ten wickets in an innings, doing so against Pakistan in 1999. His bowling figures of 10 wickets for 75 runs remains the best innings figures at the stadium. As of September 2019, 39 five-wicket hauls have occurred at this ground.

As of August 2019, five bowlers have taken ODI five-wicket hauls at the Arun Jaitely Stadium. West Indian Viv Richards was the first to take an ODI five-wicket haul at this ground when he took 6 wickets for 41 runs against India in 1989. Harbhajan Singh was the first Indian to take an ODI five-wicket haul at the ground, doing so against England in 2006.

No bowler has taken a five-wicket haul in a T20I match held at the ground.

Tests

One Day Internationals

References

External links

Feroz Shah Kotla